Jacques d'Agar (Danish: Jacob d'Agar 9 March 1640 – 16 November 1715) was a French  portrait painter born in Paris. He was a pupil of Jacob Ferdinand Voet. He began his career as an history painter, but
he soon abandoned history for portraiture, in which branch of art he became very successful.

In 1675 he was admitted into the Academy, and also became painter in ordinary to the king and his court. Upon the revocation of the Edict of Nantes, Agar, as a Protestant, was shut out from the Academy. He accordingly left France in 1682, never to return.

He was invited to the court of Denmark, and was greatly patronized by King Christian V.  His self-portrait is in the Galleria degli Uffizi in Florence, having been painted for Cosimo III de' Medici in 1693, at the request of King Christian. Walpole tells us that he visited England, where he resided some time, and met with success. He painted the portraits of several members of the British nobility of Queen Anne's reign, including the Duchess of Montagu, the Countesses of Rochfort and Sunderland, Thomas Earl of Strafford, and others. A portrait of Charles II of England, by him, is said to have been formerly in the Gallery at Christiansburg.

He died in 1716 in Copenhagen. His son Charles d'Agar also became a portrait painter.

References

Sources

Further reading
 
 
 
 
 
 
 

French Baroque painters
French portrait painters
1640 births
1715 deaths
Painters from Paris
Danish Baroque painters
Danish male painters
17th-century French painters
French male painters
18th-century French painters
18th-century French male artists